Cairn Lee is a prehistoric monument in Aberdeenshire, Scotland. Cairn Lee and proximate Longman Hill are the oldest prehistoric features in the local area.

See also
B9031 Road
Dubford
Gardenstown

References

Buildings and structures in Aberdeenshire